The Nikkei Shinshun Hai (Japanese 日経新春杯) is a Japanese Grade 2 flat horse race in Japan for Thoroughbreds of at least four years of age. It is a handicap race run over a distance of 2,400 metres at Kyoto Racecourse in January.

The Nikkei Shinshun Hai was first run in 1954 and was elevated to Grade 2 status in 1984. The race was run over 2200 metres at Chukyo Racecourse in 2021.

Among the winners of the race have been Stay Gold, Glory Vase, Rulership, Mejiro Bright and Mikki Rocket.

Winners since 1984 

 The 2021, 2022 and 2023 runnings took place at Chukyo while Kyoto was closed for redevelopment.

See also
 Horse racing in Japan
 List of Japanese flat horse races

References

Turf races in Japan